The All-time Azadegan League table is a ranking of all Iranian football clubs based on their performance in the Azadegan League, the second highest division of professional football in Iran. It was the top-level football league in Iran from its foundation in 1991 until 2001, when the Persian Gulf Pro League was established. In this ranking, 3 points are awarded for a win, 1 for a draw, and 0 for a loss, although the Azadegan League awarded 2 points for a win until the 1995–96 season. The table that follows is accurate as of the start of the 2022–23 season. Teams in bold are part of the 2022–23 Azadegan League.

Notes:Only league matches, Play-offs are not included in the all-time table  
1 Nassaji Mazandaran was deducted three points in the 2012–13 season  
2 Aluminium Arak was formerly known as PAS Arak, Shensa Arak, Hamyari Arak and Shahrdari Arak  
3 Malavan was deducted six points in the 2018–19 season  
4 Payam Mashhad was deducted three points in the 2010–11 season  
5 Damash Gilan was formerly known as Esteghlal Rasht and Pegah Gilan  
6 Shahid Ghandi Yazd was formerly known as Tarbiat Yazd  
7 Shahrdari Tabriz was deducted all 47 points in the 2012–13 season  
8 Rahian Kermanshah was formerly known as Shirin Faraz  
9 Rayka Babol was formerly known as Khooneh be Khooneh  
10 Golreyhan Alborz was formerly known as Oxin Alborz  
11 Steel Azin was formerly known as Ekbatan  
12 Steel Azin was deducted twelve points in the 2011–12 season  
13 Gahar Zagros was formerly known as Damash Lorestan  
14 Damash Tehran was formerly known as Parseh Tehran  
15 Havadar was formerly known as Persepolis Pakdasht and Sorkhpooshan Pakdasht  
16 Zagros Yasouj was formerly known as Shahrdari Yasouj  
17 Saba Qom was formerly known as Saba Battery  
18 Persepolis Shomal was formerly known as Saipa Shomal  
19 Yazd Louleh was formerly known as Sang Ahan Bafgh  
20 Padideh Khorasan was meanwhile known as Shahr Khodrou Khorasan  
21 Albadr Bandar Kong was deducted six points in the 2011–12 season

References 

Dynamic lists
Azadegan League
Azadegan League